Milton James Black (born June 20, 1949) is a Canadian retired professional ice hockey forward. He played in 186 games in the World Hockey Association with the Winnipeg Jets.

References

External links
 

1949 births
Living people
Canadian ice hockey forwards
Chicago Blackhawks draft picks
Ice hockey people from Winnipeg
People from Saint Boniface, Winnipeg
Winnipeg Jets (WHA) players